Matthew Montgomery (born 10 May 2000) is a South African cricketer. He made his Twenty20 debut for KwaZulu-Natal in the 2018 Africa T20 Cup on 15 September 2018. In January 2019, he was named as the captain of the South Africa national under-19 cricket team, ahead of their tour to India. He made his first-class debut for KwaZulu-Natal in the 2018–19 CSA 3-Day Provincial Cup on 17 January 2019.

He made his List A debut for KwaZulu-Natal in the 2018–19 CSA Provincial One-Day Challenge on 20 January 2019, scoring a century. He was the leading run-scorer for KwaZulu-Natal in the tournament, with 221 runs in four matches.

References

External links
 

2000 births
Living people
South African cricketers
KwaZulu-Natal cricketers
Nottinghamshire cricketers
Cricketers from Johannesburg